SOLOS: the jazz sessions is a 39-part television music profile/performance series produced in Canada by Original Spin Media. Each episode features complete musical pieces, interviews and behind-the-scenes footage with some of today's most notable jazz artists.
Shot in HDTV with multiple moving cameras and a medley of elegant, cinematic lighting designs, SOLOS: the jazz sessions showcases an exciting and dynamic variety of jazz styles – from the blues and boogie-woogie to bebop and beyond. The series premiered on Bravo! in Canada in the summer of 2004 and has subsequently been broadcast on HDNet, CBC Bold, Rave HD, Sky Arts, VTR Chile, and Mezzo TV. The programs are filmed at Toronto's Berkeley Church performance and event venue.

Season 1
 Bill Frisell
 Joe Lovano
 Brad Mehldau
 Charlie Hunter
 Andrew Hill
 Jacky Terrasson
 Kevin Breit
 Phil Dwyer
 Michael Kaeshammer
 James Blood Ulmer
 Mike Murley
 Paul Plimley
 Cyro Baptista

Season 2
 Greg Osby
 Andy Statman
 Lee Konitz
 John Abercrombie
 Gonzalo Rubalcaba
 Kurt Rosenwinkel
 Mark Turner
 Steven Bernstein
 Don Thompson
 Roscoe Mitchell
 Erik Friedlander
 Ethan Iverson
 Reid Anderson

Season 3

 Dave Young
 Marilyn Lerner
 Lorraine Desmarais
 Jean Beaudet
 Kelly Joe Phelps
 Jon Ballantyne
 David Braid
 Quinsin Nachoff
 Matt Wilson
 Matthew Shipp
 Matt Wilson & Lee Konitz
 Greg Osby & John Abercrombie

References

External links
 From Official Website
 From AllAboutJazz
 Library of Congress
 Clips and Videos

2000s Canadian variety television series
2004 Canadian television series debuts
Television shows filmed in Toronto
2000s Canadian music television series